Lafayette (formerly La Fayette) is a city in Contra Costa County, California, United States.  As of 2020, the city's population was 25,391. It was named after the Marquis de Lafayette, a French military officer of the American Revolutionary War.

History
Before the colonization of the region by Spain, Lafayette and its vicinity were inhabited by the Saclan tribe of the indigenous Bay Miwok. Ohlone also populated some of the areas along Lafayette Creek. The indigenous inhabitants' first contact with Europeans was in the late 18th century with the founding of Catholic missions in the region. These initial contacts developed into conflict, with years of armed struggle, including a battle on what is currently Lafayette soil in 1797 between the Saclan and the Spanish, and eventually resulting in the subjugation of the native population.

Most of what is currently Lafayette was given as a Mexican land grant, Rancho Acalanes to Candelario Valencia in 1834.  The name Acalanes seems to have come from the name of a native village in the area, Ahala-n.

American settlement started with the arrival of Elam Brown from St. Joseph, Missouri, in 1846. He purchased Rancho Acalanes in 1848. The settlement continued to steadily grow due to its proximity to San Francisco; starting with Brown's group of 18 settlers, by the census in 1852, 76 people were listed as living in the area. Brown founded a mill in 1853.

One of the original settlers in Brown's party was Milo J. Hough. He built a hotel in 1853 near Plaza Park and in 1854 was named postmaster of the Acelanus post office, probably an alternate spelling of the original land grant, Acalanes. The post office was short-lived, closing the following year.

A school began in 1852 in a one-room schoolhouse, taught by a 25-year-old Kentucky migrant, Benjamin Shreve. By 1865 the school had expanded to 43 students in five classes, and so in 1868 a tax levy of $1,000 was used to build a new schoolhouse; school expanded from a five-month year to a nine-month year. In 1893, a new schoolhouse was built to accommodate the increasing number of students; this building still stands today.

On March 2, 1857, the LaFayette post office was established by the U.S. Postal Service. (The official document giving this exact date was supplied to the Lafayette Historical Society in 1993 by the Historical Division of the U.S. Postal Service.) Prior to 1857 the community that is now known as "Lafayette" actually had no official name but was sometimes called  Dog Town, Brown's Corner, Brown's Mill, and (when Milo Hough was postmaster in 1854–1855) Alcalanus.

The name "LaFayette" came together with the community's first post office. In 1857 Benjamin Shreve, owner and manager of a roadside hotel-general store (which faced today's Lafayette Plaza), applied for a post office for the community, first requesting the name Centerville. When informed that a post office with that name already existed in California, Shreve suggested La Fayette, after the French general who became a hero of the American Revolution (probably not because his wife was a native of Lafayette, Indiana). The first LaFayette post office was established at 3535 Plaza Way and Shreve became the town's first permanent postmaster, holding the job for 30 years.

Spelling: On the original document from the U.S. Postal Service, dated March 2, 1857, the name “LaFayette” is unmistakably written as one word with a capital “F” in the middle. In 1864 the place name "Lafayette" first appeared on a map of the area, titled "Bancroft's Map of California, Nevada, Utah and Arizona (copyrighted 1863. Scale: 24 miles to 1 inch). Yet research by Ruth Dyer, Lafayette historian, shows that the name of the post office and of the new town itself soon began to be written as two words, “La Fayette.” By 1890 it had changed to one word, "Lafayette," and so appeared in an official communication from the U.S. "Post Office Department" in Feb. 1899. Then by 1905 it was back to two words. Finally on March 31, 1932, the name of the post office was officially changed to Lafayette, which has remained unchanged to this day. Lafayette was the tenth post office established in Contra Costa County. (See Salley, History of California Post Offices).

In the early 1860s, Lafayette was briefly the site of a station for the Pony Express.

In the mid-1900s, Lafayette was transformed from an agricultural village into a commuter town, and was incorporated in 1968.

Geography

The city is part of the greater San Francisco Bay Area and has its own station on the BART public transit system. Lafayette is situated between Walnut Creek, Moraga, and Orinda, and, together with the latter two towns, is considered locally as part of "Lamorinda".

Climate
Lafayette is separated from greater Berkeley and Oakland by the Berkeley Hills (and the Caldecott Tunnel running beneath), a geographical boundary within the East Bay which also represents interesting meteorological, cultural, and political distinctions. Like the rest of the San Francisco Bay Area, Lafayette has a Mediterranean climate (Köppen climate classification Csa); however, the climate differences can be striking: during the summer, temperatures can soar beyond  in Lafayette and its neighboring cities while the areas west of the hills and nearer to the bay remain up to 20 degrees cooler. Summers are warm, dry and very sunny (although mornings can be foggy); winters are cool and damp, with occasional freezes. Most of the annual rainfall comes in the winter, although there are still plenty of clear days during that time. The region directly east of the hills is generally known for its more suburban or rural atmosphere, and features rolling, grassy hills which highlight a more peaceful and domestic aura. In the southwestern part of Lafayette, is the Lafayette Reservoir, and Briones Regional Park extends into the northern part of Lafayette. Lafayette's wildlife communities include mixed woods and oak woodlands.

Demographics

The 2010 United States Census reported that Lafayette had a population of 23,893. The racial makeup of Lafayette was 20,232 (84.7%) White, 166 (0.7%) African American, 66 (0.3%) Native American, 2,162 (9.0%) Asian, (2.1%) Pacific Islander, 240 (1.0%) from other races, and 1,000 (4.2%) from two or more races. Hispanic or Latino of any race were 1,388 persons (5.8%).

The Census reported that 23,794 people (99.6% of the population) lived in households, 38 (0.2%) lived in non-institutionalized group quarters, and 61 (0.3%) were institutionalized.

There were 9,223 households, out of which 3,262 (35.4%) had children under the age of 18 living in them, 5,871 (63.7%) were opposite-sex married couples living together, 651 (7.1%) had a female householder with no husband present, 273 (3.0%) had a male householder with no wife present.  There were 306 (3.3%) unmarried opposite-sex partnerships, and 75 (0.8%) same-sex married couples or partnerships. 1,916 households (20.8%) were made up of individuals, and 802 (8.7%) had someone living alone who was 65 years of age or older. The average household size was 2.58.  There were 6,795 families (73.7% of all households); the average family size was 3.01.

The population was spread out, with 5,956 people (24.9%) under the age of 18, 1,220 people (5.1%) aged 18 to 24, 4,676 people (19.6%) aged 25 to 44, 8,069 people (33.8%) aged 45 to 64, and 3,972 people (16.6%) who were 65 years of age or older.  The median age was 45.2 years. For every 100 females, there were 94.5 males.  For every 100 females age 18 and over, there were 91.3 males.

The homeowner vacancy rate was 0.8%; the rental vacancy rate was 5.7%.  19,025 people (79.6% of the population) lived in owner-occupied housing units and 4,769 people (20.0%) lived in rental housing units.

In 2016, the median household income in Lafayette was over $140,000.

Arts and culture

Library
The Lafayette Library and Learning Center of the Contra Costa County Library is located in Lafayette. Oakmont Memorial Park is a cemetery in Lafayette. Oakwood serves as a country club/fitness center for Lamorindans.

Cross of Lafayette Memorial

In November 2006, area residents began placing crosses on a hill overlooking the Lafayette BART station and Highway 24 "to represent and memorialize the American soldiers who have died in the ongoing Iraqi war."
 As of January 2014, there are approximately 6,000 crosses in place, representing the US troops who have died in Iraq, and there is also a large sign displaying the total number of deaths. The memorial has generated public attention, media coverage and counter-protests due to its visibility from the commuter thoroughfare below. Also, since the creation of the memorial, there have been several incidents of vandalism. While some show support for the protest, other residents complain that it is disrespectful to the US military in Iraq and that it is an eyesore to the community. The memorial is on private property and modifications and trespassing without consent of the owners has been common.

Lafayette Park Theater
Another historical site found in Lafayette is the Park Theater, which first opened in 1941, and then ceased operations in 2005.   The Park Theater was originally a movie theater located on an intersection where the La Fayette statue was built. It then showed its last movie before ceasing operations in 2005.
Recently, however, efforts have been made to reopen the Park theater for viewing.

Government
As of February 10, 2021, Lafayette has 19,151 registered voters with 10,177 (53%) registered as Democrats, 3,813 (20%) registered as Republicans, and 4,298 (22%) decline to state voters.

Education
Most of Lafayette is in the Lafayette Elementary School District. A small portion is in the Orinda Union Elementary School District. All of Lafayette is in the Acalanes Union High School District.

Primary and secondary schools
Public
Lafayette Elementary School
Burton Valley Elementary
Happy Valley Elementary School
Springhill Elementary School
Stanley Middle School
Acalanes High School
Private
The Springstone School (middle and high school)
Contra Costa Jewish Day School
Chabad Hebrew School of Lamorinda
St. Perpetua School
The Meher Schools (preschool and elementary school)

Notable people
The following is a list of notable residents of Lafayette, past and present.

Past

Don Agrati, actor and musician, as Don Grady known for his roles in My Three Sons and The Mickey Mouse Club. Deceased.
Jon-Erik Beckjord, paranormal researcher and investigator, specialty was Bigfoot and related cryptids, such as the Yeti. Deceased.
Mona Beaumont, French-born American painter and printmaker.
T. Brian Callister, Lafayette native, physician, and nationally renowned health care quality and policy expert
Frank DeVol, composer, arranger, conductor, singer ("Teddy Bear's Picnic"), on TV's Fernwood 2 Night as Happy Kyne. Died in Lafayette.
Richard Ewell, former Confederate general who was a founder of Lafayette.
Andre Iguodala - Golden State Warriors basketball player, small forward.
Henry J. Kaiser, industrialist, owner of Kaiser Industries (based in Oakland comprising more than 100 companies), builder of Hoover Dam, Liberty Ships, creator of Kaiser Permanente health organization. Built and lived in elaborate estate in west Lafayette in the early 1950s.
Joe Montana, Hall of Fame football quarterback for San Francisco 49ers and Kansas City Chiefs.
Brent Mydland, musician, lived in Lafayette for a time before his death in 1990. buried at Oakmont Memorial Park in Lafayette.
Buster Posey, Major League Baseball catcher for the San Francisco Giants
Josh Reddick, Major League Baseball outfielder for the Oakland Athletics
Hideo Sasaki, American landscape architect.
Glenn T. Seaborg, University of California at Berkeley chemist and Nobel laureate (1951) prominent in the discovery of Plutonium (in 1941) and several transuranic elements. Element 106, Seaborgium, is named in his honor. Worked on Manhattan Project developing first atomic bombs. Died in 1999.
Emilio Segrè, an Italian physicist and Nobel laureate who discovered the elements technetium and astatine, and the antiproton, a sub-atomic antiparticle, for which he was awarded the Nobel Prize in Physics in 1959
Alexander Shulgin, chemist best known for discovery and use of hundreds of psychoactive compounds. Died June 2, 2014.
Charles Tickner, Olympic bronze medalist figure skater in the 1980 Winter Olympics

Present

Brandon Belt, professional baseball player for the Toronto Blue Jays, formerly of the San Francisco Giants.
Frankie Beverly, singer and songwriter, known primarily for his recordings with the band Maze.
Cam, singer and songwriter, known for the song "Burning House."
Natalie Coughlin, gold medal-winning swimmer who represented United States at 2004 Olympics in Athens, 2008 Olympics in Beijing, and 2012 Olympics in London.
Pete Docter, animator, film director, screenwriter. Chief Creative Officer of Pixar.
Wayne Ferreira, South African tennis player.
Hans Florine, world record-holding speed climber.
Will Forte, actor, writer, and comedian best known for Saturday Night Live.
 Justin Fox (born 1964), financial journalist, commentator, and writer
Brad Gillis, musician, guitarist for band Night Ranger.
Daniel Horowitz, prominent attorney who was frequent TV commentator during the Scott Peterson trial.
Brad Lackey, former professional motocross world champion
Mike Mesaros, bassist for band The Smithereens
Alanis Morissette A Canadian singer, songwriter, musician, and actress.
Jordan Poole - Professional basketball player for the Golden State Warriors
William Shurtleff, writer, researcher, bibliographer, historian, and popularizer of soyfoods
Kurtwood Smith, actor, known for his roles in RoboCop, That '70s Show, and 24.
James Van Hoften, two-time space shuttle astronaut.
Mark Yudof - 21st President of University of California

See also

Lafayette hillside memorial

References

City of Lafayette
 McCosker, Mary; Solon, Mary (2007).  Lafayette.  Images of America.  Charleston, South Carolina: Arcadia Publishing.  .

External links

Official website
Lafayette Chamber of Commerce

 
Populated places established in 1846
Incorporated cities and towns in California
Cities in Contra Costa County, California
Cities in the San Francisco Bay Area
1846 establishments in Alta California
Gilbert du Motier, Marquis de Lafayette